Andrea Heléne "Dea" Norberg (born 3 March 1974 in Bräkne-Hoby, Sweden) is a Swedish singer and choirgirl who sang in most of Sweden's Eurovision Song Contest entries during the 2000s. Norberg has been involved in the Melodifestivalen house-choir between 2003 and 2006 and 2009, the choir for Sweden in Eurovision in 1999, 2003, 2004, 2005, 2006, 2008, 2009, 2013, 2014 and in Malta's Eurovision in 2000. However Norberg saw 2009 as her last year in Melodifestivalen as she moved to Las Vegas, Nevada, United States to do shows there.

The last time she participated in Eurovision Song Contest 2016 as a backing vocalist for the Australian and Azeri entrants.

As from January 2012, Dea joined the band of Roxette as a backing vocalist on various Australian, Asian, European and North- and South American legs of their 2011–2012 and 2014–2016 world tours.

Dea is one of the vocalists in the Viva Elvis Live Band and sings "Love me tender" with Elvis in the show and on the 2010 album "Viva Elvis, The Album".

References

1974 births
Living people
21st-century Swedish singers
21st-century Swedish women singers